The 13th Northwest Territories Legislative Assembly was the 20th assembly of the territorial government and it lasted from 1995 to 1999. This assembly was dissolved due to the creation of Nunavut.

References

External links
Northwest Territories Legislative Assembly homepage

Northwest Territories Legislative Assemblies